The 2013 Belgium Ypres Westhoek Rally, formally the 49. GEKO Ypres Rally, was the sixth round of the 2013 European Rally Championship season.

Results

Special stages

References

Ypres
Ypres Rally
Ypres Rally